Panola is a small unincorporated community and census-designated place in Latimer County, Oklahoma, United States. The post office was established March 18, 1911. Panola is the Choctaw name for cotton. The high school and gymnasium are on the National Register of Historic Places.

Demographics

References

External links
Panola Public School District
 Oklahoma Digital Maps: Digital Collections of Oklahoma and Indian Territory

Census-designated places in Latimer County, Oklahoma
Census-designated places in Oklahoma